Chipita Park is an unincorporated community located in El Paso County, Colorado, named for the wife of Chief Ouray.

Those who live in the Chipita Park area are also inhabitants of Cascade, Colorado. When receiving mail, they may put Chipita Park or Cascade for the city, as both refer to the Cascade-Chipita Park, Colorado census-designated place.

See also
Cascade, Colorado
Cascade-Chipita Park, Colorado
Colorado Springs Metropolitan Statistical Area
El Paso County, Colorado
Front Range Urban Corridor
List of cities and towns in Colorado
Pikes Peak
State of Colorado

References

External links

Unincorporated communities in El Paso County, Colorado
Unincorporated communities in Colorado